Mahmoud Motlaghzadeh is an Iranian football midfielder who currently plays for Iranian football club Sanat Naft in the Persian Gulf Pro League.

Club career

Foolad
He started his career with Foolad from youth levels. In summer 2015 he joined to the first team by Dragan Skočić and signed a three-year contract which kept him at Foolad until 2018. He made his debut for Foolad in fixture XI of the 2015–16 Iran Pro League against Malavan as a substitute for Esmaeil Sharifat.

Club career statistics

References

External links
 Mahmoud Motlaghzadeh at IranLeague.ir

Living people
1994 births
Iranian footballers
People from Ahvaz
Foolad FC players
Sanat Mes Kerman F.C. players
Khooneh be Khooneh players
Sanat Naft Abadan F.C. players
Association football midfielders
Sportspeople from Khuzestan province